LA-28 is a constituency of Azad Kashmir Legislative Assembly which is currently represented by the Prime Minister of Azad Kashmir Raja Muhammad Farooq Haider Khan of Pakistan Muslim League (N). It covers the area of Chikkar in Hattian Bala District of Azad Kashmir, Pakistan.

Election 2016

elections were held in this constituency on 21 July 2016.

Election 2021 
Raja Muhammad Farooq Haider Khan of Pakistan Muslim League (N) won the seat by winning 15598 votes.

Muzaffarabad District
Azad Kashmir Legislative Assembly constituencies